Baroccianus is an adjective applied to manuscripts indicating an origin in the Baroccianum, a Venetian collection assembled by the humanist Francesco Barozzi (Barocius). A large part of that collection was sold after the death of Iacopo Barozzi or Barocci (1562-1617), nephew and heir to Francesco; and the purchase by William Herbert, 3rd Earl of Pembroke led in turn to his donation in 1629 of a substantial collection of Greek manuscripts from the Baroccianum to the Bodleian Library. The designation Codex Baroccianus followed by a number is an indication that a manuscript is in the Bodleian Catalogue and has its provenance in this donation.

History
The Earl of Pembroke's purchase cost him £700; his donation was bound in 242 volumes. He was persuaded to make the deal and gift by William Laud. Some remaining manuscripts from the collection were given by Oliver Cromwell in 1654. Both Pembroke and Cromwell were Chancellor of the University of Oxford at the time of their gifts.

In fact the manuscripts of Barozzi were already with Laud: they had been brought to England by Henry Featherstone in 1628. Featherstone acted as agent for the Bodleian, from 1621. The origins of the Oxford University Press are connected with Laud's plan to have these manuscripts edited and published, even though it took around 40 years and the efforts of John Fell to take the practical steps to create a scholarly publishing house in Oxford.

Manuscripts 

 Barocci 3 (minuscule 314 Gregory-Aland)
 Barocci 7 – Thucydides Contiones 15th century
 Barocci 15 – Psalterium in Greek, 1105 AD
 Barocci 28 – Euthymius Zigabenus, Commentaries on four Gospels, 14th century
 Barocci 29 (minuscule 46 Gregory-Aland)
 Barocci 31 (minuscule 45 Gregory-Aland)
 Barocci 55 – John Chrysostom, Homilies, 10th/11th century
 Barocci 59 (minuscule 526 Gregory-Aland)
 Barocci 96 – Menologion, palimpsest, the upper text contains poems of Gregorius Nazianzen
 Barocci 126 – Gregory Nazianzen, Homilies, 13th/14th century
 Barocci 142 – compilation of works on the history of Christianity
 Barocci 131
 Barocci 160 – Commentary on Psalms, 15th century
 Barocci 167 – John Chrysostom, Homilies on Acts of Apostles, 14th/15th century
 Barocci 170
 Barocci 197 (lectionary 205 Gregory-Aland)
 Barocci 201
 Barocci 202 (lectionary 5 Gregory-Aland)
 Barocci 206 – lectionary, 9th century, palimpsest
 Barocci 242 – John Chrysostom, Homilies on Genesis

Authors
3. Arethas
42. Manuel Moschopulus
128. John Malalas

Notes

External links 
 Mss. Barocci at the Bodleian Library 

Greek manuscripts
Bodleian Library collection
Italian manuscripts
Republic of Venice
Byzantine manuscripts